Rampura is a village in Malur Taluk, Kolar District, India. It is close to the cities of  chikatripathi and hosur

 

Villages in Kolar district